Železno may refer to:

 Eisenstadt, the state capital of Burgenland, Austria, known in Slovene as Železno
 Železno, Trebnje, small settlement northwest of Dobrnič in the Municipality of Trebnje in eastern Slovenia
 Železno, Žalec, small settlement in the Municipality of Žalec in east-central Slovenia 
 Żeleźno, village in the administrative district of Gmina Białogard, within Białogard County, West Pomerania